Wyong, an electoral district of the Legislative Assembly in the Australian state of New South Wales, has had two incarnations, the first from 1962 to 1973, the second from 1988 to the present.


Members

Election results

Elections in the 2010s

2019

2015

2011

Elections in the 2000s

2007

2003

Elections in the 1990s

1999

1995

1991

Elections in the 1980s

1988

1973 - 1988
District abolished

Elections in the 1970s

1971

Elections in the 1960s

1968

1965

1962

References

New South Wales state electoral results by district